Pray Hard is the debut studio album by Muslim Belal, released on 15 August 2009 by Halal Dawa Records.

Composition and release
In early 2009, Belal released From the Streets to Islam, a CD in which he is being interviewed and responds to the questions by rapping, this was a preview to launching his first album. Pray Hard was released by Halal Dawa Records on 15 August 2009 at the Oxford House Theatre in Bethnal Green, London.

Belal's poetry combines spiritualism with social issues and his own personal history. The album features themes of repentance, his conversion to Islam, giving advice, praising Allah, preparations for the hereafter and supplicating to Allah.

Track listing

References

2009 debut albums
Arabic-language albums
Bengali-language albums
Muslim Belal albums